The Secret of My Love is a 2017 South Korean television series starring Song Chang-eui, Kang Se-jung, Kim Da-hyun, and Park Jung-ah. The series aired on KBS2 on Monday to Friday from 7:50 p.m. to 8:30 p.m. (KST).

Plot 
A man desperately wants to be "real," so he puts on a "real" mask. A woman wants to be loved so much that she throws out her younger sister and replaces her. The drama shows the struggles of these two, man and woman, who look for ways to find true happiness in their lives.

Cast

Main 
 Song Chang-eui as Han Ji-seob / Kang Jae-wook
 Kang Se-jung as Jin Yeo-rim / Ki Seo-ra
 Kim Ji-ah as young Jin Yeo-rim / Ki Seo-ra
 Kim Da-hyun as Kang In-wook
 Park Jung-ah as Jin Hae-rim
 Jeon Hye-in as young Jin Hae-rim

Supporting

People around Jae-wook 
 Lee Hwi-hyang as Wi Seon-ae
 Yoon Joo-sang as Kang Joon-chae

People around Seo-ra 
 Jung Han-yong as Ki Ra-sung
 Hwang Young-hee as Mo Jin-ja
 Kim Chae-un as Ki Cha-ra
 Yeon Mi-joo as Ki Dae-ra

People around Hae-rim 
 Park Cheol-Ho as Jin Guk-hyun
 Lee Deok-hee as Park Ji-sook
 Lim Doo-hwan as Do Ra-hee

Original soundtrack

Part 1

Part 2

Ratings 
 In this table,  represent the lowest ratings and  represent the highest ratings.

Awards and nominations

Notes

References

External links
  
 

Korean Broadcasting System television dramas
2017 South Korean television series debuts
Korean-language television shows
2018 South Korean television series endings